Mozart Festival may refer to:

 Mainly Mozart Festival, held in San Diego, California
 Midsummer Mozart Festival, held in San Jose/San Francisco, California
 Mostly Mozart Festival, held in New York City
 Vermont Mozart Festival, held in Vermont
 Mozart Festival Würzburg, held in Würzburg, Franconia
 Festival Mozart, held in A Coruña, Spain